Hasmukhbhai Somabhai Patel (born 11 November 1960) is an Indian politician and a member of parliament to the 17th Lok Sabha from Ahmedabad East Lok Sabha constituency, Gujarat. He won the 2019 Indian general election being a Bharatiya Janata Party candidate.

Early life 

Hasmukh Patel was very active and loved by people leader in his constituency.
Earlier he was Municipal corporator for Baagh-e-firdosh and Then Indrapuri ward for three consecutive terms winning with a healthy margin.

Then for two consecutive terms he served as an MLA for Amraiwadi constituency, constitutes mainly of Indrapuri and Bhaipura apart from Vatwa, Khokhra and Ramol.

He had won in 2012, polling 1,08,683 votes against Congress’ Bipinbhai Gadhvi who polled 43,258 votes with the margin of roughly 65,000 votes.

He had won in 2017, polling 1,05,694 votes against Congress’ Arvind Chauhan who polled 55,965 votes with the margin of roughly 50,000 votes.

And then BJP was impressed by his networking and leadership qualities. He had an opportunity to become an assembly election candidate for Ahmedabad East constituency.

Ahmedabad East constituency, constitutes mainly Dahegam, Gandhinagar Dakshin, Vatva, Nikol, Naroda, Thakkarbapa Nagar and Bapunagar Vidhansabha constituencies.

In 2019 he won Ahmedabad East constituency by defeating Congress's Gitaben Patel by 4,34,330 votes.

References

Living people
India MPs 2019–present
Lok Sabha members from Gujarat
Bharatiya Janata Party politicians from Gujarat
People from Ahmedabad
1960 births